Kfar Daniel (lit. Daniel Village) is a moshav shitufi in central Israel. Located around four kilometres south-east of Lod and covering 2,900 dunams, it falls under the jurisdiction of Hevel Modi'in Regional Council.

History
During the Ottoman period, the area belonged to the Nahiyeh (sub-district) of Lod that encompassed the area of the present-day city of Modi'in-Maccabim-Re'ut in the south to the present-day city of El'ad in the north, and from the foothills in the east, through the Lod Valley to the outskirts of Jaffa in the west. This area was home to thousands of inhabitants in about 20 villages, who had at their disposal tens of thousands of hectares of prime agricultural land.

The village was established on 9 October 1949 by Mahalniks (overseas volunteers in the War of Independence) from English-speaking countries on the lands of the depopulated Palestinian village of Daniyal. It was initially called Irgun Beit Hever after the organisation which the founders were members of, but was later renamed in honour of Daniel Frish, a president of the Zionist Organization of America who died in the year the village was established.

The nearby Daniel Interchange connecting Highway 1 and Highway 6 is named after the village.

References

External links
Kfar Daniel website

Moshavim
Kibbutz Movement
Populated places established in 1949
1949 establishments in Israel
Populated places in Central District (Israel)